The Iran men's national sitting volleyball team represents Islamic Republic of Iran in international sitting volleyball competitions and friendly matches. The team is one of the dominant forces in on the court worldwide. In foreign media, team Iran is colloquially known as dream team of sitting volleyball.

Iran team dedicated sitting volleyball 2016 Rio Paralympic gold to memory of Iranian cyclist Bahman Golbarnezhad, who died during Paralympic C4/C5 competition.

Players

Players called up for 2012 Summer Paralympics:

Honours

Seniors Competitive record

Paralympic Games

World Championships

Minor Tournaments
Asian Clubs Championship Career:

  China 2013 - Gold Medal (samen alhojaj- Iran)
  China 2011 - Gold Medal (Zobahan Isfahan- Iran)
  China 2009 - Gold Medal (Asia Gostaresh Foolad Gostar- Iran)

Sarajevo Open Championship:

  Sarajevo Open 2005 - Gold Medal

Juniors Competitive record

Junior World Championships

World Ranking
As at 28 September 2016.

At 2016 Rio Paralympics, Iran was seed No. 3. Bosnia was ranked at No. 1 (seed No. 1) as the defending Paralympic champion.

Multiple gold medalists at Paralympics

This is a list of multiple gold medalists for Iran in sitting volleyball, listing people who have won three or more gold medals.

See also
 Volleyball at the Summer Paralympics
 World Organization Volleyball for Disabled
 Hadi Rezaei

References

volleyball
S
National sitting volleyball teams